Ken Bolek (born December 20, 1953) is a former minor league baseball coach, major league coach and minor league manager. He was the director of baseball at IMG Academy, a high level training school for elite baseball players from all levels of amateur and professional competition.

Bolek attended the University of Arizona and Mississippi State University. In 1975, he played collegiate summer baseball with the Chatham A's of the Cape Cod Baseball League and was named a league all-star.

Bolek got his start in coaching with Cuyahoga Community College in 1979 and 1980. During his tenure there, they were Ohio Junior College champions. At Mississippi State University in 1981, Bolek was a graduate assistant for the team as they made it to the College World Series. He then managed at the professional level (see chart below) and spent two years as a coach for the Cleveland Indians (1992–93). Bolek became  the Director of Baseball at IMG Academy in 1995.

Year-by-year managerial record

References

External links
 Bio

1953 births
Living people
Cleveland Indians coaches
Asheville Tourists managers
University of Arizona alumni
Mississippi State University alumni
Chatham Anglers players